Nicodemo Oliverio, better known as Nicholas St. John, is an American screenwriter.  He has collaborated with film director Abel Ferrara in nine films together including The Driller Killer (1979), Body Snatchers (1993) and The Addiction (1995), as well as Ms. 45 (1981) and King of New York (1990).  For his work in the film The Funeral (1996), St. John was nominated for the Independent Spirit Award for Best Screenplay.

Life and career
St. John attended Lakeland High School.  It was at high school where he met and befriended Ferrara. Both he and Ferrara attended and graduated from New York University.

Under the pseudonym Nicholas George, St. John wrote the screenplay for Ferrara's 1976 pornographic film, 9 Lives of a Wet Pussy.  He went on to write the screenplay of Ferrara's directorial debut, The Driller Killer (1979).  Then, St. John wrote Ferrara's second film, Ms. 45 (1981).

A notable Ferrara film in which St. John did not write the screenplay was Bad Lieutenant (1992).  A Catholic, St. John refused to work with Ferrara on that particular film because of its blasphemous images.  St. John also tried to dissuade Ferrara and Harvey Keitel, who played the titular role, from even making it.  Despite this, St. John wrote the scripts of Ferrara's subsequent films Body Snatchers and Dangerous Game, both released in 1993.  The last two films that St. John has written to date are Ferrara's The Addiction (1995) and The Funeral (1996).

In 2005, it was reported that St. John co-wrote a script with Danish filmmaker Nicolas Winding Refn titled Billy’s People.  However, the script was never made into a film due to box office disaster results from Refn's films Bleeder (1999) and Fear X (2003).

Ferrara said of St. John in 2015, "We started making films when we were 16, and then at a certain point he just had enough, you dig? He didn’t dig the business, he didn’t dig the spirituality of the business, didn’t dig the lifestyle; and at the height of his game, of our game, he just said: enough."  It has been said that St. John and Ferrara's longtime collaboration ended as a result of a falling-out.

Filmography
9 Lives of a Wet Pussy (1976)
The Driller Killer (1979)
Ms. 45 (1981)
Fear City (1984)
China Girl (1987)
King of New York (1990)
Dangerous Game (1993)
Body Snatchers (1993)
The Addiction (1995)
The Funeral (1996)

References

External links

Living people
American male screenwriters
New York University alumni
American Roman Catholics
Screenwriters from New York (state)
Year of birth missing (living people)